Léna Bernstein (1906–1932) was the first woman to fly across the Mediterranean Sea, a distance of .

Bibliography

1906 births
1932 deaths
People from Leipzig
French women aviators
People from the Province of Saxony
French aviation record holders
French women aviation record holders
Women aviation record holders
20th-century French women